Hallvard Eika (5 December 1920 – 17 May 1989) was a Norwegian politician for the Liberal Party.

He was elected to the Norwegian Parliament from Telemark in 1969, and was re-elected on one occasion. During his first term he served twice in different cabinets. On 21 August 1970 he was appointed Minister of Agriculture during the centre-right cabinet Borten, replacing Bjarne Lyngstad. He held the position until the cabinet Borten fell in 1971. Meanwhile, Eika was busy with his appointment to the Borten cabinet, Sigurd Kalheim took his seat in Parliament.

When the next centrist government was formed in 1972 by Prime Minister Lars Korvald, Eika was appointed Minister of Trade and Shipping and again had to leave his seat in Parliament. Again he was replaced by Sigurd Kalheim, who then left the Liberal Party for the Liberal People's Party two months into his tenure. Eika was re-elected to Parliament at the 1973 general elections. He was still a member of the Korvald cabinet for some weeks, until Trygve Bratteli formed his second cabinet, upon which point Eika returned to serve as a Parliament representative. Eivind Øygarden had acted as replacement him during this short period.

Eika was mayor of Bø in 1967–1970, and then served as a municipal council member in the periods 1970–1971, 1975–1979 and 1979–1983.

Outside politics he graduated from the Norwegian College of Agriculture in 1946. From 1977 to 1985 he was director of agriculture in Telemark county.

References

1920 births
1989 deaths
Liberal Party (Norway) politicians
Ministers of Trade and Shipping of Norway
Ministers of Agriculture and Food of Norway
Members of the Storting
Mayors of places in Telemark
Norwegian College of Agriculture alumni
20th-century Norwegian politicians
People from Bø, Telemark